Mark Allen Sweeney (May 27, 1959 – May 6, 2022) was an American politician and businessman who served as a member of the Montana Senate for the 39th district from January 4, 2021, until his death.

Early life and education 
Sweeney was born in Butte, Montana on May 27, 1959. He earned a Bachelor of Science degree in natural resource management from the University of Montana Western.

Career 
Sweeney served as a manager in the Montana Department of Fish, Wildlife and Parks from 1980 to 2012. He has also worked as the broker and owner of Montana Blue Ribbon Real Estate. Since 2010, he has operated a natural resources management consulting firm. Sweeney was an unsuccessful candidate for the Montana Public Service Commission in 2012 and Montana House of Representatives in 2018. He was elected to the Montana Senate in November 2020 and assumed office on January 4, 2021. At the time of Sweeney's death, he was running for the Democratic nomination in Montana's 2nd congressional district for the 2022 election.

Personal life
Sweeney lived in Philipsburg, Montana. He died at his home on May 6, 2022, aged 62.

References 

1959 births
2022 deaths
21st-century American politicians
Businesspeople from Montana
Candidates in the 2022 United States House of Representatives elections
Democratic Party Montana state senators
People from Granite County, Montana
Politicians from Butte, Montana
University of Montana Western alumni